Štěpánek (feminine Štěpánková) is a Czech surname, and may refer to:

 Brian Stepanek, American actor
 Emil Stepanek (1895–1945), Austrian set designer and film architect
 Jakub Štěpánek, Czech ice hockey player
 Josef Štěpánek Netolický (1460–1539), Czech fishpond builder and architect
 Lucie Štěpánková, Czech actress
 Martin Štěpánek (free-diver) (born 1977), world class free-diver and record-holder
 Mattie Stepanek (1990–2004), American poet and advocate
 Miroslav Štěpánek (footballer) (born 1990), Czech footballer
 Miroslav Štěpánek (artist) (1930–2005), Czech artist
 Ondřej Štěpánek (born 1979), Czech slalom canoeist
 Pavel Štěpánek (born 1931), leading participant in parapsychology experiments throughout the 1960s
 Radek Štěpánek (born 1978), Czech tennis player
 Stephen Stepanek, American politician
 Svatoslav Štěpánek, Czech serial killer
 Vratislav Štěpánek, Czech Hussite bishop
 Zdeněk Štěpánek (1896–1968), Czech actor

See also
Music Through Heartsongs: Songs Based on the Poems of Mattie J.T. Stepanek

Czech-language surnames
Patronymic surnames
Surnames from given names